The Iceland Fed Cup team represents Iceland in Fed Cup tennis competition and are governed by the Icelandic Tennis Association.  They currently compete in the Europe/Africa Zone of Group III.

History
Iceland competed in its first Fed Cup in 1996. They won their only tie to date in 2008, defeating Zimbabwe in Europe/Africa Zone Group II Round Robin play. Prior to 2008, Iceland had only won one rubber, against Cameroon in 1997.

Players

See also
Fed Cup
Iceland Davis Cup team

External links

Billie Jean King Cup teams
Fed Cup
Fed Cup